Luca Mora (born 10 May 1988) is an Italian professional footballer who plays as a midfielder for  club Pescara.

Club career
Mora made his professional debut in the Lega Pro for Alessandria on 19 September 2014 in a game against Pavia.

On 22 January 2021 he returned to SPAL on a 1.5-year contract.

On 15 July 2022, Mora signed with Pescara.

References

External links
 

Living people
1998 births
Sportspeople from Parma
Association football midfielders
Italian footballers
Crociati Noceto players
Aurora Pro Patria 1919 players
U.S. Alessandria Calcio 1912 players
S.P.A.L. players
Spezia Calcio players
Delfino Pescara 1936 players
Serie A players
Serie B players
Serie C players
P.D. Castellarano players
Footballers from Emilia-Romagna